The 196th Infantry Brigade ("Chargers"), also known as the Charger Brigade was first formed on 24 June 1921 as part of the United States Army Reserve's 98th Division with the responsibility of training soldiers.

World War II
During World War II, the 98th initially defended Kauai, Hawaii and Maui, Hawaii, and finally responsible for defending Oahu, Hawaii later in the war.
The Division began intensive training in May 1945 to prepare for the invasion of Japan, but the war ended before they could depart Hawaii. However, the unit arrived in Japan for occupation duty as the 3rd Platoon, 98th Reconnaissance Troop Mechanized, of the 98th Infantry Division, where it eventually was inactivated on 16 February 1946, in Charlotte, NC.

Service in the Vietnam War
The brigade was reactivated in September 1965 at Fort Devens Massachusetts, where it was originally scheduled to be sent to the Dominican Republic.  Instead, the Army rushed it to Vietnam, the Brigade departing on 15 July 1966 via transport ships and arriving on 14 August 1966 at Tây Ninh Combat Base.  It began operations almost immediately in the western area of III Corps Tactical Zone. The brigade conducted Operation Cedar Falls, Gadsden, Lancaster, Junction City, Benton, and Attleboro (in War Zone C of Tay Ninh Province). Attleboro turned into a major action after a large enemy base camp was found on 19 October 1966.

In April 1967, Gen. William Westmoreland ordered the formation of a division sized Army task force to reinforce American forces in I Corps Tactical Zone.  The 196th was selected to form a part of the task force. Task Force Oregon became operational on 20 April 1967, when troops from the 196th landed at Chu Lai Base Area in I Corps. Over the next month, it was joined by the 1st Brigade, 101st Airborne Division and the 3rd Brigade, 25th Infantry Division (later redesignated the 3rd Brigade, 4th Infantry Division). In September 1967 Task Force Oregon was redesignated the 23rd Infantry Division (Americal) and an official change of colors ceremony was held on 26 October 1967. Later, the 1st Brigade, 101st Airborne and the 3rd Brigade, 25th Infantry Division were replaced by the 198th and 11th Light Infantry Brigades.

As part of the 23rd, the 196th participated in Operations Wheeler/Wallowa, Golden Fleece, Fayette Canyon, Frederick Hill, Lamar Plain, Elk Canyon I and Elk Canyon II. In early May 1968, the Brigade's 2nd Battalion, 1st Infantry Regiments was flown in to assist other US forces at the Battle of Kham Duc. On 29 November 1971, the 196th became a separate temporary entity to safeguard this same area of operations. An entire company of the 196th was also involved in opposing the war by famously sitting down on the battlefield.

In April 1972, the 196th moved to Da Nang to assist in port security duties. Units of the brigade were rotated through Phu Bai Combat Base to provide base security. The brigade finally left Vietnam on 29 June 1972 as the last combat brigade to leave Vietnam. The 196th served in Vietnam from 15 July 1966 through 29 June 1972. The brigade suffered 1,188 killed-in-action, and 5,591 wounded-in-action during its service in Vietnam.

Operations as a separate Brigade (15 July 1966 – 25 September 1967)
Cedar Falls
Gadsden
Lancaster
Attleboro
Junction City
Benton

Operations as a part of the Americal Division (25 September 1967 – June 1972)
Wheeler/Wallowa
Golden Fleece
Fayette Canyon
Frederick Hill
Lamar Plain
Elk Canyon I
Elk Canyon II

Headquarters locations during the Vietnam War
Tay Ninh, August 1966 to May 1967
Chu Lai, June 1967 to October 1967
Tam Kỳ, November 1967 to March 1968
Phong Dien, April 1968 to June 1968
Hoi An, June 1968 to March 1971
Da Nang, April 1971 to June 1972

ORDER OF BATTLE

Brigade Infantry & Brigade Artillery
2d Battalion, 1st Infantry
3d Battalion, 21st Infantry
1st Battalion, 46th Infantry
4th Battalion, 31st Infantry
3rd Battalion, 82nd Artillery

Brigade Reconnaissance
Troop F, 8th Cavalry (Air)
Troop F, 17th Cavalry (Armored)
1st Squadron, 1st Cavalry (Armored)
64th Infantry Platoon (Combat Tracker)
48th Infantry Platoon (Scout Dog)
LRRP, 196th Infantry Brigade (later reflagged as Co E, 51st Infantry)

Brigade Support
8th Support Battalion
175th Engineer Company
23rd Military Police Company
408th Radio Research Detachment (ASA)
635th Military Intelligence Detachment, Team 2
544th Military Police Platoon
687th Signal Company
196th Signal Company (Prov)
27th Chemical Detachment
10th Public Information Detachment
HHD & Band, 196th Support Battalion (Prov)
569th Military Intelligence Detachment
Company C, 37th Signal Battalion, 1st Signal Brigade (62nd. Co.)

Post Vietnam
On 26 May 1998, the 196th Infantry Brigade was reactivated during a ceremony at Fort Shafter, Hawaii. The newly reflagged brigade, previously designated as the Training Support Brigade Pacific, is organized as a Training Support Brigade, and is assigned to United States Army Pacific (USARPAC).  The 196th Infantry Brigade provides National Defense Authorization Act Title XI pre-mobilization, post-mobilization and demobilization support to Army reserve component units in Alaska, American Samoa, Arizona, the Commonwealth of Mariana Islands (CNMI), Guam, the Hawaiian Islands, Japan and the Republic of Korea.  The 196th Infantry Brigade executes its mobilization operations at Mobilization Force Generation Installation (MFGI) Hawaii at Schofield Barracks and at Joint Base Elmendorf-Richardson (JBER), and at three Mobilization Sites, located in Guam, Japan and the Republic of Korea.  The Brigade is also designated by USARPAC as the Validation Authority for reserve component forces mobilized onto Title 10 United States Code, Active Duty.  Since 2001, the 196th Infantry Brigade has trained more than 10,000 Soldiers that deployed to support combat operations in Iraq, Afghanistan, Horn of Africa, and the Southern Philippines. The 196th Infantry Brigade also supports annual USARPAC and United States Indo-Pacific Command (USINDOPACOM) Theater Security Cooperation Program (TSCP) exercises such as Balikatan, Cobra Gold, Yama Sakura, Talisman Saber, Hamel, and Terminal Fury. The brigade also serves as the USARPAC executive agent for training and readiness oversight (TRO) over the Alaska, Guam and Hawaii National Guard Weapons of Mass Destruction (WMD) Civil Support Teams (CST), and the Hawaiian Army National Guard Chemical, Biological, Radiological, Nuclear and High Explosive (CBRNE) Enhanced Force Package (CERFP).

In 2007, the 196th Infantry Brigade was awarded the Army Superior Unit Award for its support to the War on Terror in preparing reserve component units and Soldiers for combat duty.

In 2013, USARPAC assigned the Joint Pacific Multinational Readiness Capability (JPMRC) to the 196th Infantry Brigade, which serves as the core of an Operations Group (OPSGROUP) for the capability.  JPMRC provide enhanced live, virtual, constructive collective training opportunities to USARPAC Battalion Task Forces and Brigade Combat Teams at their home station and at sites throughout the Indo-Pacific.  
 
As of 2019, the 196th Infantry Brigade consists of:

 HQ & HHC, 196th Infantry Brigade, Fort Shafter, Oahu, Hawaii
 1st Battalion, 196th Infantry Brigade, "Mavericks" located at Kapolei, Oahu, Hawaii
 2nd Battalion, 196th Infantry Brigade, "Arctic Chargers" located at Joint Base Elmendorf-Richardson, AK
 3rd Battalion, 196th Infantry Brigade, "Spartans" located at Barrigada, Guam
 Support Battalion, 196th Infantry Brigade, "Cobras" located at Fort Shafter Flats, Oahu, Hawaii
 Joint Pacific Multinational Readiness Capability, located at Schofield Barracks, Oahu, Hawaii

Medal of Honor
On 31 July 2017 President Donald Trump awarded the Medal of Honor to Specialist 5 James McCloughan McCloughan received his medal 48 years after his actions while servings as combat medic with C Company, 3rd Battalion 21st Infantry, 196th Light Infantry Brigade.

Other recipients of the Medal of Honor include:
Corporal Michael J. Crescenz; A Company, 4th Battalion, 31st Infantry
20 November 1968
Specialist 4 Thomas J. McMahon; A Company 2nd Battalion, 1st Infantry
19 March 1969
Private First Class Daniel J. Shea; HHC 3rd Battalion 21st Infantry
14 May 1969
Specialist Donald Sloat; D Company, 2nd Battalion, 1st Infantry
17 January 1970
Staff Sergeant Robert C. Murray; B Company, 4th Battalion, 31st Infantry
7 June 1970

In popular culture

The dramatic TV series Tour of Duty, which ran on CBS from 1987 to 1990, depicted a platoon of infantrymen serving in Vietnam from the 196th during the show's first season.

In Season 2, episode 4 of the TV series Prison Break, Theodore "T-Bag" Bagwell pretends to be a soldier from the 196th Brigade to a police officer.

Notable members
Rocky Bleier, Vietnam War
Jim Byrnes, Vietnam War
Richard Chaves, Vietnam War

Notes

External links
"The Brigade: A History, Its Organization and Employment in the US Army"
Summers, Harry G. Historical Atlas of the Vietnam War. New York: Houghton Mifflin Company.
http://196th.org/History.htm
https://web.archive.org/web/20070608211009/http://www.usarpac.army.mil/196th/history.htm
http://www.lzcenter.com/Operations.html Article by Pete Shotts used with permission.

196
196
196th Light
Military units and formations established in 1921